Brungle is a village community in the central east part of the Riverina region, New South Wales, Australia. It has a population of 112.

Brungle Post Office opened on 1 January 1868 and closed in 1975.

Brungle is home to a large community of Waradajhi people. The Brungle Public School is testament to this with its sign at the front of the school, written in the local Aboriginal language that states Gadhang Burri Yalbillinga which means Happy Children Learn.  The school was established back in 1868 and has an enrolment of approximately 26 pupils in two classes of whom at any one time about 56% are Waradajhi.

References

External links

Towns in the Riverina
Towns in New South Wales
Parishes of Buccleuch County
Geography of New South Wales
Snowy Valleys Council